In graph theory, Vizing's conjecture concerns a relation between the domination number and the cartesian product of graphs. 

 

Since Vizing proposed his conjecture, many mathematicians have worked on it, with partial results described below. For a more detailed overview of these results, see .

Examples 

A 4-cycle  has domination number two: any single vertex only dominates itself and its two neighbors, but any pair of vertices dominates the whole graph. The product  is a four-dimensional hypercube graph; it has 16 vertices, and any single vertex can only dominate itself and four neighbors, so three vertices could only dominate 15 of the 16 vertices. Therefore, at least four vertices are required to dominate the entire graph, the bound given by Vizing's conjecture.

It is possible for the domination number of a product to be much larger than the bound given by Vizing's conjecture. For instance, for a star , its domination number  is one: it is possible to dominate the entire star with a single vertex at its hub. Therefore, for the graph  formed as the product of two stars, Vizing's conjecture states only that the domination number should be at least . However, the domination number of this graph is actually much higher. It has  vertices:  formed from the product of a leaf in both factors,  from the product of a leaf in one factor and the hub in the other factor, and one remaining vertex formed from the product of the two hubs. Each leaf-hub product vertex in  dominates exactly  of the leaf-leaf vertices, so  leaf-hub vertices are needed to dominate all of the leaf-leaf vertices. However, no leaf-hub vertex dominates any other such vertex, so even after  leaf-hub vertices are chosen to be included in the dominating set, there remain  more undominated leaf-hub vertices, which can be dominated by the single hub-hub vertex. Thus, the domination number of this graph is  far higher than the trivial bound of one given by Vizing's conjecture.

There exist infinite families of graph products for which the bound of Vizing's conjecture is exactly met.

Partial results

Clearly, the conjecture holds when either  or  has domination number one: for, the product contains an isomorphic copy of the other factor, dominating which requires at least  vertices.

Vizing's conjecture is also known to hold for cycles and for graphs with domination number two.

Upper bounds

 observed that

 

A dominating set meeting this bound may be formed as the cartesian product of a dominating set in one of G or H with the set of all vertices in the other graph.

Notes

References

.
.
.
.
.
.
.
.
.
.
.

External links

Graph invariants
Graph products
Conjectures
Unsolved problems in graph theory